Juan Carlos Núñez Orozco (born 18 April 1983) is a Mexican former professional footballer who played as a defender.

Club career
In 2008, Núñez started playing for the Club Tijuana Xoloitzcuintles De Caliente. In 2010, he helped Tijuana obtain the Apertura 2010 champions. Then on May 21, 2011, his team advanced to the Primera División.

Titles

References

1983 births
Living people
Mexican footballers
Association football defenders
Club Tijuana footballers
Atlético Mexiquense footballers
Deportivo Toluca F.C. players
Liga MX players